Alfred Lecerf (4 October 1948 in Eupen – 7 February 2019 in Eupen) was a politician of the German-speaking Community of Belgium. He was a member of the Christian Social Party (CSP).

Lecerf has been a member of the municipal council of Lontzen from 1976 to 2018. He has also been mayor of Lontzen since 1994 to 2018.

From 1978 till 1981 he was a member of the Parliament of the German-speaking Community.

References 

 Grenz-Echo
 Cumuleo
 Union des Villes et Communes de Wallonie
 Ehemaliger Lontzener Bürgermeister Alfred Lecerf gestorben

1948 births
2019 deaths
Christlich Soziale Partei (Belgium) politicians
Mayors of places in Belgium
Members of the Parliament of the German-speaking Community
People from Eupen
People from Lontzen